Pierre Goyer is a Canadian politician and a city councillor in Montreal, Quebec.

City councillor
He was elected to Montreal's city council as a Montreal Citizens' Movement (RCM) candidate in the district of Jean-Talon in 1986, defeating the incumbent, George Savoidakis, of the Civic Party of Montreal. In 1989, he left the RCM and founded the Democratic Coalition of Montreal with three other colleagues.

He was re-elected in the district of Saint-Édouard in 1990. In 1992, he left the Coalition with colleague Claudette Demers-Godley to sit as an Independent.

Member of Executive Committee
In 1994, Goyer ran as a Vision Montreal candidate. He was re-elected and became a member of Montreal's Executive Committee. In 1997, he was asked to resign from the Executive Committee. He left Vision Montreal and sat as an [independent, but refused to resign from the Executive Committee.

Political decline
In 1998, he ran as a candidate for Jean Doré's Team Montreal but was defeated by François Purcell.

References

See also

 Vision Montreal Crisis, 1997

Goyer, Pierre
Living people
Year of birth missing (living people)